Mark Lemon (30 November 1809, in London – 23 May 1870, in Crawley) was the founding editor of both Punch and The Field. He was also a writer of plays and verses.

Biography

Lemon was born in Marylebone, Westminster, Middlesex, on 30 November 1809. He was the son of Martin Lemon, a hop merchant, and Alice Collis. His parents married on 26 December 1808 at St Mary, Marylebone, Westminster. His father died in Hendon in 1818, and between 1817 and 1823 Lemon lived at Church Farmhouse, where a blue plaque commemorates him. 

Lemon was educated at Cheam School, then in Surrey. This was then strictly for the sons of gentlemen only, and a boy had to leave when his father was found to be a tradesman, with a shop in London selling cutlery. It seems that the family background of young Lemon was not discovered.

At the age of 15, Lemon was sent to live in Boston, Lincolnshire, with his mother's brother Thomas Collis.

Lemon had a natural talent for journalism and the stage, and at 26 retired from less congenial business to devote himself to the writing of plays. More than sixty of his melodramas, operettas and comedies were produced in London, whilst at the same time he was contributing to a wide variety of magazines and newspapers.

He married Helen (Nelly) Romer, on 28 September 1839 in Kensington, London and had eight children – sons Mark, Frank and Henry, and daughters Alice, Betty, Helen, Mary and Kate. Frank died shortly after he was born. Betty married Sir Robert Romer and their son was Mark Lemon Romer.

In 1841 Lemon and Henry Mayhew conceived the idea of a humorous weekly paper to be called Punch, and when the first number was issued, in July 1841, were joint editors and with the printer and engraver equal owners. The paper was for some time unsuccessful, Lemon keeping it alive out of the profits of his plays. On the sale of Punch, Lemon became sole editor for the new proprietors. It remained under his control until his death, achieving remarkable popularity and influence.

Two other long-running magazines in which Lemon played a significant part were the Illustrated London News, the first publication to make use of pictures as well as text in reporting, which was founded by his friend Herbert Ingram, and The Field, of which he was founder editor (1853–57).

Lemon was an actor of ability, a pleasing lecturer and a successful impersonator of Shakespearian characters. He played in the 1851 production of Not So Bad As We Seem, a play written by Edward Bulwer featuring many notable Victorians, including Charles Dickens. He also wrote novelettes and lyrics, over a hundred songs, a few three-volume novels, several Christmas fairy tales and a volume of jests. He was a stalwart of the London gentlemen's Savage Club.

Lemon died in his adopted home town Crawley, West Sussex on 23 May 1870 and was buried in St Margaret's Church, Ifield. A blue plaque commemorates him outside The George Hotel, Crawley.

References

Works
The Boys of London - The Steam Boat Call Boy (1844) Published in The Illuminated Magazine pp. 340–342

Attribution

External links

The Field magazine

1809 births
1870 deaths 
19th-century English dramatists and playwrights
19th-century English male writers
19th-century British journalists
19th-century British businesspeople
English magazine editors
British male journalists
British magazine founders
English male dramatists and playwrights
English male non-fiction writers
People educated at Cheam School
People from Crawley
Punch (magazine) people
Writers from London